Flin Flon/Bakers Narrows Water Aerodrome  is located on the North Arm of Lake Athapapuskow in the community of Bakers Narrows, Manitoba, Canada.

See also
Flin Flon Airport
Flin Flon/Channing Water Aerodrome

References

Registered aerodromes in Manitoba
Seaplane bases in Manitoba